The 2018 American Athletic Conference Football Championship Game was an NCAA Division I college football conference championship game for the American Athletic Conference (AAC) played on December 1, 2018. It was the 4th American Athletic Conference Championship, and was played at Spectrum Stadium in Orlando, Florida.

UCF hosted Memphis, the second consecutive year the Knights hosted the Tigers in the American Athletic Conference Football Championship Game, and fourth meeting between the two schools in the past two seasons. With starting quarterback McKenzie Milton out for the season, the Knights rallied from a 17-point halftime deficit behind back-up quarterback Darriel Mack Jr. and won the conference championship for the second year in a row, and fourth time overall.

Teams

Memphis

Under the leadership of third-year head coach Mike Norvell, the Memphis Tigers entered the American Championship with a record of 8–4, 5–3 in conference play. They started the season 3–2, with both losses in-conference (at Navy, at Tulane). They rebounded by annihilating Connecticut at home, but then lost to No. 10 UCF. Following a non-conference loss the following week, the Tigers improved on their 4–4 record by winning all four of their remaining games, giving them a four-game win streak coming into their American title game rematch with the Knights.

UCF

With first-year head coach Josh Heupel at the helm, the No. 7 Knights entered the American title game riding a 24-game win streak dating back to the start of their 2017 season. Prior to the contest, their record stood at 11–0, 8–0 in conference play. The Knights opened the season ranked 21st in the AP poll, but steadily improved with wins over Connecticut, Pittsburgh, Memphis, Temple, No. 19 Cincinnati, and South Florida. The Knights entered the AAC Championship with a 12–1 record all-time against the Tigers; Memphis won their first meeting in 1990 and UCF took every matchup since. However, they faced a potentially devastating blow when the quarterback who had led them through their ongoing winning streak, McKenzie Milton, suffered a catastrophic knee injury in the South Florida game.

Game summary

First quarter

UCF won the coin toss and elected to defer to the second half. On the fourth play of the game, Tigers running back Darrell Henderson broke free for a 62-yard touchdown run, and a quick 7–0 lead for Memphis. Knights quarterback Darriel Mack Jr. then fumbled away the ball at the UCF 27, leading to Henderson's second touchdown. The Knights finally got on the board, going 65 yards in 7 plays, with a 14-yard touchdown run by Greg McCrae. The Memphis rushing attack struck again quickly. Facing 3rd & 4 at their own 30 yard line, Patrick Taylor Jr. broke free for a 70-yard touchdown, and 21–7 lead. The miscues for the Knights continued, as Mack was sacked and fumbled, leading to a Tigers field goal and a shocking 24–7 lead at the end of the first quarter.

Second quarter
As the second quarter began, the Knights were driving into Tigers territory. A 20-yard completion from Mack to Gabe Davis sparked the drive, and UCF eventually reached the red zone. Facing 3rd & Goal at the 6, Mack ran up the middle for an apparent touchdown, but the ball was fumbled and bouncing live into the endzone, dangerously close to going out-of-bounds. Michael Colubiale fell on the ball and recovered it for the UCF touchdown.

Darrell Henderson continued to punish the Knights defense. On the second play of their next drive, he blasted for an 82-yard touchdown run, and a 31–14 Tigers lead. With under 4 minutes left in the half, a Memphis punt set UCF deep at their own 6 yard line. Mack threw a 44-yard pass to Gabe Davis, then Greg McCrae broke free for a 47-yard run all the way to the 3 yard line. Mack's 4 yard touchdown pass to Jake Hescock made the score 31–21. The Knights forced a 3-and-out and Memphis punted with 1:50 remaining. But Otis Anderson muffed the punt, and Memphis recovered. With 21 seconds left in the half, Darrell Henderson connected with Sean Dykes for a 4-yard touchdown pass, and the Tigers led 38–21 at halftime.

Third quarter
UCF received the ball to start the third quarter, and proceeded to dominate the second half. The Knights would score five touchdowns on five consecutive drives, erasing a 17-point deficit, and held the Tigers to only three points in the second half. Darrell Henderson was held to only 3 yards in the second half, while Darriel Mack Jr. threw for a touchdown, and rushed for four more. Mack sparked the rally with a 54-yard touchdown to a wide-open Otis Anderson, who ran untouched to the endzone. Later, Memphis managed to drive to the UCF 2 yard line, but Brady White's pass to the endzone fell incomplete off the fingertips of Damonte Coxie as he hit the ground. The Tigers settled for a field goal, and clung to a 41–35 lead.

Fourth quarter
The Knights took their first lead of the game (42–41) with a touchdown in the opening seconds of the fourth quarter. With 9:26 remaining, Memphis kicker Riley Patterson missed a 36-yard field goal attempt, and the Knights held their lead. UCF iced the game with two more touchdown, and an interception in the endzone with 33 seconds to go.

Quarterback Darriel Mack Jr., in only his second start for the Knights, finished with 348 yard passing, 1 touchdown pass, 59 yards rushing, and 4 rushing touchdowns, to claim the game's MVP honors. The Knights extended their winning streak to 25 games, and set a new NCAA Division I FBS record with their 25th consecutive game scoring 30 or more points.

Scoring summary

Statistics

References

Championship
American Athletic Conference Football Championship Game
Memphis Tigers football games
UCF Knights football games
Sports competitions in Orlando, Florida
American Athletic Conference Football Championship Game
American Athletic Conference Football Championship Game